The Isle of Man Football Association Cup is the foremost football cup competition for teams playing on the Isle of Man. The tournament, founded in 1889, features the twenty six teams from the Isle of Man Premier League and Division 2. The tournament is overseen by the Isle of Man Football Association.

Corinthians are the current champions.

Peel are the most successful club, with 32 titles.

List of champions 

 1889/90  Douglas
 1890/91  Peel
 1891/92  Peel and Ramsey (shared)
 1892/93  Ramsey
 1893/94  Ramsey
 1894/95  Gymnasium
 1895/96  Ramsey
 1896/97  Douglas
 1897/98  Douglas Wanderers
 1898/99  Ramsey
 1899/1900  Ramsey
 1900/01  Ramsey
 1901/02  Gymnasium
 1902/03  Gymnasium
 1903/04  Gymnasium
 1904/05  Ramsey
 1905/06  Port St Mary
 1906/07  Ramsey
 1907/08  Ramsey
 1908/09  Peel
 1909/10  Douglas Wanderers
 1910/11  Gymnasium
 1911/12  Castletown
 1912/13  St Marys 
 1913/14  Castletown
 1919/20  Ramsey
 1920/21  Gymnasium
 1921/22  Ramsey
 1922/23  Castletown
 1923/24  Rushen United
 1924/25  Rushen United
 1925/26  Rushen United
 1926/27  Peel
 1927/28  Douglas Wanderers
 1928/29  St Georges
 1929/30  Peel
 1930/31  Ramsey
 1931/32  Gymnasium
 1932/33  Peel
 1933/34  Rushen United
 1934/35  Peel
 1935/36  Rushen United
 1936/37  Peel
 1937/38  Braddan
 1938/39  Peel
 1945/46  Peel
 1946/47  St Georges
 1947/48  Peel
 1948/49  Peel
 1949/50  Castletown
 1950/51  Rushen United
 1951/52  Ramsey
 1952/53  Peel
 1953/54  Peel
 1954/55  St Georges
 1955/56  RAF Jurby
 1956/57  St Georges
 1957/58  Peel
 1958/59  Peel
 1959/60  Peel
 1960/61  Peel
 1961/62  Castletown
 1962/63  Peel
 1963/64  Peel
 1964/65  Douglas HSOB
 1965/66  Douglas HSOB
 1966/67  Douglas HSOB
 1967/68  Douglas HSOB
 1968/69  Peel
 1969/70  Douglas HSOB
 1970/71  Pulrose United
 1971/72  St Johns United
 1972/73  Peel
 1973/74  Peel
 1974/75  Peel
 1975/76  St Johns United
 1976/77  Peel
 1977/78  Rushen United
 1978/79  Ramsey
 1979/80  Ramsey
 1980/81  Ramsey
 1981/82  Peel
 1982/83  Douglas HSOB
 1983/84  Peel
 1984/85  Castletown
 1985/86  Gymnasium
 1986/87  Gymnasium
 1987/88  Gymnasium
 1988/89  Douglas HSOB
 1989/90  Rushen United
 1990/91  Douglas HSOB
 1991/92  Douglas HSOB
 1992/93  Castletown
 1993/94  St Marys
 1994/95  St Marys 
 1995/96  Douglas HSOB
 1996/97  Peel
 1997/98  St Marys 
 1998/99  Peel
 1999/2000  Gymnasium
 2000/01  St Marys 
 2001/02  St Marys
 2002/03  Ayre United
 2003/04  Ramsey
 2004/05  St Georges
 2005/06  Laxey
 2006/07  Peel
 2007/08  St Georges
 2008/09  Douglas HSOB
 2009/10  St Georges
 2010/11  Rushen United
 2011/12  St Georges
 2012/13  St Marys 
 2013/14  St Georges
 2014/15  St Georges
 2015/16  Peel
 2016/17  St Georges
 2017/18  Corinthians
 2018/19  Peel
 2019/20  not held
 2020/21  Corinthians

References

Football competitions in the Isle of Man